The A80 is a road in Scotland, running from the A8 to Moodiesburn, north east of Glasgow. Prior to the M80 opening, the A80 was one of Scotland's busiest trunk roads.

Original Route

The A80 was once the main route from Glasgow to Stirling. It has now been superseded by the M80 motorway which roughly follows the route of the original A80.

A80 / M80 Upgrade project

History
One of Scotland's worst traffic jams has a reputation for being the A80. In 1992, the M80 Stepps bypass opened between the M8 and Stepps to relieve pressure on the road. This caused the M80 to lie in two parts with the A80 providing the link between the two sections: between the end of the Stepps bypass, and the 1974 section of the M80 which resumed at Haggs. The Stepps-Haggs stretch, built in the 1960s, was under-capacity in relation to the amount of traffic it carried, and the lack of hard shoulders meant that a vehicle breakdown potentially could cause massive jams

Auchenkilns roundabout upgrade 

Despite long-term plans to replace the Stepps-Haggs section with a completed M80, the troublesome Auchenkilns roundabout in Cumbernauld was replaced by a grade separated junction in 2005 as traffic congestion meant it could not wait for the final upgrade (which at that stage, was still in planning). A dumbbell interchange junction between the A80, A73 and B8048 was opened in November 2005, but the widely regarded long-term solution to the A80's problems was to replace it entirely with a motorway which would bypass Cumbernauld completely. There was a scheme devised in the 1970s to do just that, which would have linked western segment of the M80, linking to the M8, to the eastern segment, where it connects to the A803 and M876, through what was known as the Kelvin Valley Route.

M80 Stepps to Haggs completion project 
See M80 motorway

The Scottish Executive announced in 2002 that the A80 would be upgraded to Motorway standard, replacing the A80 from Stepps to Haggs with the M80. The Kelvin Valley route was not chosen as it would have breached the Antonine Wall and destroyed the Castlecary Roman fort; instead an on-line upgrade through Cumbernauld was selected.

The upgrade was completed in September 2011.

References 

Roads in Scotland
Transport in Glasgow
Transport in North Lanarkshire
Transport in Stirling (council area)